Hadith of Fatima tablet, also known as the Hadith of Lowh of Fatima is a tradition of Imam al-Sadiq who narrated his father Imam al-Baqir who in turn quoted Jabir ibn Abdullah as the original narrator of the hadith. This hadith specifically names twelve Imams as successors to Muhammad, prophet of Islam.

Jabir ibn Abdullah

Jābir ibn ʻAbdullāh ibn ʻAmr ibn Ḥarām al-Anṣāriyy (d. 697 CE/78 AH) was a prominent companion of Muhammad, the prophet of Islam, and the subsequent Shi'i Imams. He delivered the greeting of the prophet to his second great-grandson, Muhammad al-Baqir. Jabir took part in eighteen campaigns headed by the prophet and fought in the Battle of Siffin led by Ali.

Narration
In Kitab al-Kafi, Jābir narrates that he once saw Fatimah with a tablet listing the names of those with divine authority, which he counted to be twelve. The last one was named al Qa'im, three were named Muhammad and three were named Ali.

The Hadith
Twelver Muslims record that Ja'far al-Sadiq narrated a hadith:

Reception
The Hadith of Fatima tablet is mentioned in shia and sunni hadith sources including Kamal al-din wa tamam al-ni'mah of Al-Shaykh al-Saduq, Kitab al-Kafi of Muhammad ibn Ya'qub al-Kulayni, Al-Istibsar of Shaykh Tusi, al-Musnad of Ahmad ibn Hanbal, Sahih al-Bukhari of Muhammad al-Bukhari, Sunan ibn Majah of Ibn Majah.

See also
 The event of Ghadir Khumm#The sermon
 Book of Fatimah

References 

Hadith